Megan Romano (born February 2, 1991) is an American competition swimmer who specializes in backstroke and freestyle events.  She is part of the current American record women's 4x100-meter freestyle relay team, and is the short-course yards American record-holder in the 200-yard freestyle and 4x200-meter freestyle relay. Along with her Georgia Bulldogs teammates, she won the NCAA Division I women's team championship in 2013.

Swimming career

Italian american, at the 2012 United States Olympic Trials, the qualifying meet for the 2012 Olympics, Romano narrowly missed the Olympic team by finishing seventh in the 200-meter freestyle with a time of 1:58.56 (the top six finishers were selected for the relay). Romano also competed in the final of the 100-meter backstroke and place eighth in the final.

At the 2012 Short Course World Championships, Romano won four medals: two gold, one silver, and one bronze. On the first day, Romano led off the relay and had a split of 1:56.03 in the 4×200 free relay. Along with teammates Chelsea Chenault, Shannon Vreeland, and Allison Schmitt, they won with a time of 7:39.25. Romano earned her first individual medal with a silver in the 100-meter free on the third day of competition, finishing behind Germany's Britta Steffen with a 52.48. Later, she anchored the 4×100 medley relay to a bronze-medal-winning 3:51.43 with the fastest split in the field of 51.90. In Romano's last event, she led off the relay with a split of 52.86, and along with Jessica Hardy, Lia Neal, and Allison Schmitt, won the 4×100 free relay in 3:31.01, nearly two seconds ahead of second-place finisher Australia.

At the 2013 World Aquatics Championships in Barcelona, Romano anchored the women's 4×100-meter freestyle relay to a gold medal, overtaking Australia's Alicia Coutts in the final 100 meters. She entered the water 7 tenths of a second behind Coutts, but beat the Australian by a margin of 0.12. Her split of 52.60 was a personal best and second-fastest of anyone in the field. The final relay time of 3:32.31 bettered the previous American record of 3:34.24. Romano earned her second medal, a gold, in the 4×100-meter medley relay with Missy Franklin, Jessica Hardy, and Dana Vollmer. Swimming the anchor leg, Romano recorded a split of 53.43 and the team finished with a time of 3:53.23.

Personal bests

See also
 List of University of Georgia people
 Georgia Bulldogs

References

External links
 
 
  Megan Romano – University of Georgia athlete profile at GeorgiaDogs.com

1991 births
Living people
American female backstroke swimmers
American female freestyle swimmers
Georgia Bulldogs women's swimmers
Medalists at the FINA World Swimming Championships (25 m)
World Aquatics Championships medalists in swimming
Universiade medalists in swimming
Universiade gold medalists for the United States
Universiade silver medalists for the United States
Universiade bronze medalists for the United States
American people of Italian descent
Medalists at the 2011 Summer Universiade
Medalists at the 2013 Summer Universiade